Tetranemertes is a genus of worms belonging to the family Poseidonemertidae.

The genus has almost cosmopolitan distribution.

Species:

Tetranemertes antonina 
Tetranemertes hermaphroditicus 
Tetranemertes rubrolineata

References

Nemerteans